The lesser flamingo (Phoeniconaias minor) is a species of flamingo occurring in sub-Saharan Africa and western India. Birds are occasionally reported from further north, but these are generally considered vagrants.

Characteristics
The lesser flamingo is the smallest species of flamingo, though it is a tall and large bird by most standards. Most of the plumage is pinkish white. The clearest difference between this species and the greater flamingo, the only other Old World species of flamingo, is the much more extensive black on the bill. Size is less helpful unless the species are together, since the sexes of each species also differ in height.

The extinct species Phoeniconaias proeses in the same genus, from the Pliocene of Australia, is thought to have been even smaller. 

The lesser flamingo may be the most numerous species of flamingo, with a population that (at its peak) probably numbered up to two million individual birds. This species feeds primarily on Spirulina, algae which grow only in very alkaline lakes. Presence of flamingo groups near water bodies is indication of sodic alkaline water which is not suitable for irrigation use.  Although blue-green in colour, the algae contain the photosynthetic pigments that give the birds their pink colour. Their deep bill is specialised for filtering tiny food items.

Predators
Lesser flamingos are prey to a variety of species, including marabou storks, vultures, baboons, African fish eagles, jackals, hyenas, foxes, Great white pelicans, Martial Eagle, and big cats.

Breeding

In Africa, where they are most numerous, the lesser flamingos breed principally on the highly caustic Lake Natron in northern Tanzania. Their other African breeding sites are at Etosha Pan, Makgadikgadi Pan, and Kamfers Dam. The last confirmed breeding at Aftout es Saheli in coastal Mauritania was in 1965. Breeding occurred at Lake Magadi in Kenya in 1962 when Lake Natron was unsuitable due to flooding. In the early 20th century, breeding was also observed at Lake Nakuru.

The species also breeds in southwestern and southern Asia. In 1974, they bred at the Rann of Kutch, but since then, only at the Zinzuwadia and Purabcheria salt pans in northwestern India. Some movement of individuals occurs between Africa and India.

Like all flamingos, they lay a single chalky-white egg on a mound they build of mud. Chicks join creches soon after hatching, sometimes numbering over 100,000 individuals.

Conservation
Despite being the most numerous species of flamingo, it is classified as near threatened due to its declining population and the low number of breeding sites, some of which are threatened by human activities.

The population in the two key East African lakes, Nakuru and Bogoria, have been adversely affected in recent years by suspected  heavy metal poisoning, while its primary African breeding area in Lake Natron is currently under threat by a proposed soda ash plant by Tata Chemicals. The only breeding site in South Africa, situated at Kamfers Dam, is threatened by pollution and encroaching development.

The lesser flamingo is one of the species to which the Agreement on the Conservation of African-Eurasian Migratory Waterbirds applies.

Media

References

External links

Flamingo Resource Centre -  a collection of resources and information related to flamingos
 ARKive - Images and movies of the lesser flamingo (Phoenicopterus minor)
 Lesser Flamingo - Species text in The Atlas of Southern African Birds.
 Save the Flamingo - A site dedicated to the conservation of the South African breeding colony

lesser flamingo
lesser flamingo
Birds of Sub-Saharan Africa
Birds of South Asia
Birds of the Middle East
Near threatened animals
Near threatened biota of Africa
Near threatened biota of Asia
lesser flamingo
Articles containing video clips